Tim "Mit" Schuller (né Fredric Thomas Schuller; Salem, Ohio – 29 February 2012, Dallas, Texas) was an American, Dallas–Fort Worth-based music critic, who, for 37 years – from 1975 until his death – chronicled living blues and jazz musicians, mostly from Texas (particularly from the Dallas–Fort Worth area and the Southwest).

Career 
Some of Schullers writings – notably those about Freddie King, Buster Smith, and Lightnin' Hopkins – have been cited in academic and encyclopedic publications. According to a Buddy magazine staff editor, Schuller provided blues pianist Boston Smith (né Boston Beverly Smith; 1907–1989) (Buster Smith's brother) with an epitaph worthy of his achievements.

He also was an update editor of the 2002 revised edition of MusicHound Blues: The Essential Album Guide (Schirmer Trade Books / Omnibus Press). At the time of his death, he had been writing a book, Scorning All Borders, covering 30 years of writing about Texas jazz and blues artists.

Early years 
Schuller was born in Salem, Ohio, to Frederick Kane Schuller (1908–1956) and Mary Louise Layden (maiden; 1912–2005). Tim's father, who had been a newspaper journalist, died when he was seven. As a teenager, Tim attended Salem High School, graduating in 1967. During his senior year, he was the feature editor of the Salem Quaker, his high school newspaper. Tim went on to study at Kent State University at Salem, but did not graduate. In Ohio, Schuller had worked as a musician (playing guitar), a factory worker, and a stringer reporter.

Schuller then moved to Chicago with his childhood friend from Salem, Tom "Mot" Dutko (né Thomas Lawrence Dutko; 1949–2017), a blues drummer. Who went on to record with Little Al Thomas and the Crazy Horse Band, Billy Branch, and Eddie Shaw. In Chicago, Schuller played with Robert Lockwood Jr. and John Brim. Dutko also played drums for Big Walter Horton, Sunnyland Slim, Homesick James, Jimmy Walker, Erwin Helfer, and Eddie Taylor.

Schuller moved to Dallas around 1977 and briefly embarked in the record business.  In 1977, he was worked at Peaches Records & Tapes at Cole and Fitzhugh Avenues, Dallas. Ken E. Shimamoto (born 1957), a music journalist in Dallas worked there with him. In 1980, Schuller was assistant manager at Sound Town at the Valley View Mall in Dallas.

Over the next 35 years, Schuller contributed to the following newspapers, periodicals, and records:

Periodicals and newspapers

 Guitar Player, Living Blues, Blues Access
 The Met (Dallas' arts & entertainment weekly)
 Southwest Blues
 DownBeat
 Buddy magazine
 Texas Jazz
 Juke Blues
 Coda
 Crazy Music (the journal of the Australian Blues Society)
 D Magazine
 Dallas Morning News,
 Dallas Observer
 Texas Observer
 Contemporary Keyboard
 Texas Highways
 Akron Beacon Journal

Discography

 Lucky Seven Records
 Black Top
 Trix
 Wolf Records (de) (Vienna, Austria)
 Bullseye Blues
 Fedora Records
 Blind Pig
 TKO Magnum Music
 Blue Moon
 Continental Blue Heaven (distributed by Harmonia Mundi)
 Cannonball Records (nl) 29110
 AudioQuest Music
 TopCat Records
 Mayhem Records
 JSP

Affiliations 
 In 1987, Schuller – with Chuck Nevitt (né Charles Franklin Nevitt; 1956–2015) (record collector), Brian "Hash Brown" Calway (né Brian Everett Calway; born 1955) (blues musician) – founded the Dallas Blues Society.

Tributes 
 Tim Schuller benefit, Poor David's Pub, Dallas, May 27, 2012

Father, family, and death 
Schuller's father, Fred Kane Schuller had been a journalist in Pennsylvania and Ohio with over 13 newspapers, He had been in the editorial staff with the Youngstown Telegram (around 1935), staff editor for several years at the Cleveland News, night sports editor at the Pittsburgh Press (around 1940), editorial staff of the Daily News (McKeesport, Pennsylvania), managing editor of the Lorain Journal, and, near his death, worked for a stint at the Saint Petersburg Times.  He was also an AP writer and contributor to Collier's and the Saturday Evening Post.  He was a personal friend of John Barrymore, and after his death, corresponded with the family, including Lionel Barrymore.

Schuller's mother, Mary Louise Layden (maiden), died in 2005 in New York City. His older sister, Molly Davis (née Molly Lou Schuller) has lived in New York City since the 1950s.

Tim Schuller died February 29, 2012, in Dallas.  He is buried in Salem, Ohio, at Grandview Cemetery.

Notes about cited periodicals and labels

Books 

<li> MusicHound Blues: The Essential Album Guide (1998)
Edited by Leland Rucker
Foreword by Al Kooper
1st Paper, 1st Printing edition (1997)
Visible Ink Press

Revised & updated (January 1, 2002)
Leland Rucker (ed.)
Al Kooper (forward)
Tim Schuller (update editor)
Schirmer Trade Books
Omnibus Press

Periodicals 

 
 
 
 
 
 
 
 
<li>

Record labels 

 
<li> 
 
<li> 
 
 
<li> 
<li>

Notes and references

Notes

References 

1949 births
2012 deaths
American music critics
American music journalists
Jazz writers
People from Dallas
Writers from Dallas
Blues historians
American music historians
American male non-fiction writers
Music historians
People from Salem, Ohio
Historians from Ohio
Historians from Texas